Mariusz Dmochowski (29 October 1930 – 7 August 1992) was a Polish actor. He appeared in more than 45 films and television shows between 1958 and 1992.

Partial filmography

 Eroica (1958) - Lt. Korwin Makowski (segment "Ostinato Lugubre")
 Dezerter (1958) - Hauptsturmführer Franz Steiner
 Bad Luck (1960) - UB Officer
 Przeciwko bogom (1961) - Piotr Doron
 Swiadectwo urodzenia (1961) - Gestapo Officer (segment "Kropla krwi")
 Mezczyzni na wyspie (1962)
 Mój drugi ozenek (1964) - Marcin Szypula
 Panienka z okienka (1964) - Duke Jerzy Ossolinski
 Zawsze w niedziele (1966)
 Miejsce dla jednego (1966)
 Bicz bozy (1967) - Parish Priest
 Hrabina Cosel (1968) - August II
 The Doll (1968) - Stanislaw Wokulski
 Colonel Wolodyjowski (1969) - Jan Sobieski
 Prawdzie w oczy (1970) - inzynier Franciszek Zawada
 Zazdrosc i medycyna (1973) - Widmar
 A Woman's Decision (1975) - Dyrektor zakladu
 Hotel Pacific (1975) - Pancer (voice)
 Przepraszam, czy tu bija? (1976) - Olo
 Tredowata (1976) - Count Barski
 The Scar (1976) - Vorsitzender
 Mimetismo (1977) - Vice Dean
 Camouflage (1977) - Krynicki
 Golem (1980) - Holtrum, Rozyna's Father
 Ojciec królowej (1980) - King Jan III Sobieski
 Czule miejsca (1981)
 The War of the Worlds: Next Century (1981) - Head of TV Station
 Widziadlo (1984) - Huk / Priest
 O-Bi, O-Ba: The End of Civilization (1985) - Millionaire
 Milosc z listy przebojów (1985) - Stefan Ujma
 Cien juz niedaleko (1985) - Józef Wenda
 Rajska jablon (1986) - Filip
 C.K. dezerterzy (1986) - General
 Pilkarski poker (1989) - 'Powisle' Chairman Kmita
 Alchemik (1989) - Master Melchior
 Do widzenia wczoraj (1993) - Wladyslaw

References

External links

1930 births
1992 deaths
Polish male film actors
20th-century Polish male actors
People from Piotrków Trybunalski
Recipient of the Meritorious Activist of Culture badge